Dmitri Yuryevich Chistyakov (born 13 January 1994) is a Russian football player. He plays as a centre-back for Zenit St. Petersburg.

Club career
He made his professional debut in the Russian Professional Football League for FC Zenit-2 St. Petersburg on 15 July 2013 in a game against FC Tosno.

On 7 June 2019, he signed a 4-year contract with FC Rostov. He made his debut in the Russian Premier League for Rostov on 13 July 2019 in a game against FC Orenburg.

On 15 October 2020 he returned to Zenit St. Petersburg on loan.

On 3 June 2021, he moved to Zenit on a permanent basis and signed a 4-year contract with the club.

International career
He was called up to the Russia national football team for the first time for UEFA Euro 2020 qualifying matches against Scotland and Cyprus, on 10 and 13 October 2019.

On 11 May 2021, he was named as a back-up player for Russia's UEFA Euro 2020 squad.

He made his debut on 8 October 2021 in a World Cup qualifier against Slovakia.

Honours
Zenit Saint Petersburg
Russian Premier League: 2020–21, 2021–22
Russian Super Cup: 2021, 2022

Career statistics

Club

References

External links
 
 

1994 births
People from Leningrad Oblast
Living people
Russian footballers
Russia youth international footballers
Russia international footballers
Association football defenders
FC Mika players
FC Shinnik Yaroslavl players
FC Tambov players
FC Rostov players
FC Zenit Saint Petersburg players
Russian Premier League players
Russian First League players
Russian Second League players
Armenian Premier League players
Russian expatriate footballers
Expatriate footballers in Armenia
FC Zenit-2 Saint Petersburg players
Sportspeople from Leningrad Oblast